The 2019 European Parliament election in Belgium was held on 26 May 2019 in the three Belgian constituencies: the Dutch-speaking electoral college, the French-speaking electoral college and the German-speaking electoral college.

A royal order of 15 June 2018 fixed the date of the European Parliament election in Belgium, following an agreement at European level. Per the Belgian Constitution, the Belgian regional elections, and additionally the Belgian federal election because no snap election occurred, were automatically held on the same day.

Marianne Thyssen, who was re-elected Member of the European Parliament in 2014 as lijsttrekker for CD&V and who subsequently became European Commissioner, announced in July 2018 that she would quit politics in 2019.

Electoral system

As the reapportionment after Brexit did not impact the number of seats allocated to Belgium, 21 MEPs were elected in Belgium, as in the 2014 election. One of them is by law allocated to the German-speaking electoral college and the remaining ones are allocated to the Dutch-speaking and to the French-speaking electoral college in accordance with a population formula, giving them respectively twelve and eight seats, as in 2014.

Voters could only vote on the lists depending on the language area they live in. This means that in the bilingual arrondissement of Brussels-Capital, voters could choose whether to vote for the Dutch-speaking or for the French-speaking electoral college. There was an exception to this rule for the six municipalities with language facilities in the Brussels Periphery, whose inhabitants could also opt to vote for French-speaking lists despite being in the Dutch language area.

Seats were allocated according to the D'Hondt method in each of the three electoral colleges; however, the German-speaking electoral college de facto used a first-past-the-post system, since it elected only one MEP. The electoral threshold was 5%, which was based on the vote share per electoral college rather than nationally.

All Belgian citizens aged 18 or over and residing in Belgium were obligated to participate in the election.

Other EU citizens residing in Belgium as well as Belgians living in another EU member state had the right to vote on Belgian lists in European Parliament elections. The law of 17 November 2016 extended this right to Belgians living in a non-EU member state, which was already possible for federal elections.

Results

Elected members

Groups

From 2019 European Parliament election#Groups

Outgoing delegation

External links 

 Elections 2019 - Federal Public Service Interior

References

Belgium
European Parliament elections in Belgium
2019 elections in Belgium